The 1908–09 British Home Championship was an international football tournament between the British Home Nations. England dominated the competition with three wins over their opponents. When placed in the context of their overseas tours to Europe in 1908 and 1909, this made a run of ten victories for the English side led by prolific goalscorer Vivian Woodward. Wales, who were enjoying one of their most successful periods of international football, came second with two victories and Scotland finished third. Ireland finished last with no points and only two goals.

England and Ireland began the tournament with England starting well, scoring four without reply. Wales and Scotland began their competition in March, the Welsh winning a close game in Wrexham 3–2. Scotland's response was a 5–0 thumping of the Irish in a strong display of goalscoring ability. England reaffirmed their position as favourites with a 2–0 win over Wales before Wales too made a final push for the title, becoming the only team in this edition of the tournament to win a match away, beating Ireland 3–2 in Belfast. In the final game, England needed only a draw to win the championship undisputed. In the event they did better, scoring twice against Scotland without reply to take the title.

Table

Results

Winning squad

References

1909 in British sport
Brit
Brit
1908–09 in English football
1908–09 in Scottish football
1908-09